Kumārila Bhaṭṭa (fl. roughly 700) was a Hindu philosopher and a scholar of Mimamsa school of philosophy from early medieval India. He is famous for many of his various theses on Mimamsa, such as Mimamsaslokavarttika. Bhaṭṭa was a staunch believer in the supreme validity of Vedic injunction, a champion of Pūrva-Mīmāṃsā and a confirmed ritualist. The Varttika is mainly written as a subcommentary of Sabara's commentary on Jaimini's Purva Mimamsa Sutras. His philosophy is classified by some scholars as existential realism.

Scholars differ as regards Kumārila Bhaṭṭa's views on a personal God. For example, Manikka Vachakar believed that Bhaṭṭa promoted a personal God (saguna brahman), which conflicts with the Mīmāṃsā school. In his Varttika, Kumārila Bhaṭṭa goes to great lengths to argue against the theory of a creator God and held that the actions enjoined in the Veda had definite results without an external interference of Deity.

Kumārila is also credited with the logical formulation of the Mimamsic belief that the Vedas are unauthored (apauruṣeyā). In particular, he is known for his defense of Vedic ritualism against medieval Buddhist idealism. His work strongly influenced other schools of Indian philosophy, with the exception that while Mimamsa considers the Upanishads to be subservient to the Vedas, the Vedanta school does not think so.

Early life 

The birthplace of Kumārila Bhatta is uncertain. According to the 16th-century Buddhist scholar Taranatha, Kumārila was a native of South India. However, Anandagiri's Shankara-Vijaya states that Kumarila came from "the North" (udagdeśāt), and debated the Buddhists and the Jains in the South.

Another theory is that he came from eastern India, specifically Kamarupa (present-day Assam). Sesa's Sarvasiddhanta-rahasya uses the eastern title Bhattacharya for him. His writings indicate that he was familiar with the production of silk, which was common in present-day Assam. Yet another theory is that he comes from Mithila, which has similar culture to   Assam, and produced another scholar on the subject Mandana Misra.

Linguistics views
Kumārila Bhaṭṭa and his followers in the Mīmāṃsā tradition known as  argued for a strongly Compositional view of semantics called abhihitānvaya or "designation of what has been denoted." In this view, the meaning of a sentence was understood only after understanding first the meanings of individual words.  Word referents were independent, complete objects, a view that is close to the Fodorian view of language, according to philosopher Daniel Arnold. He also used several Tamil words in his works, including one of the earliest mention of the name Dravida in North Indian sources, found in his Tantravārttika.

The above-mentioned view of sentence meaning was debated over some seven or eight centuries by the followers of the Prabhākara school within Mīmāṃsā, who argued that words do not directly designate meaning. Rather, word meanings are understood as already connected with other words (anvitābhidhāna, anvita = connected; abhidhāna = denotation).  This view was influenced by the holistic arguments of Bhartṛhari's  theory. Essentially the Prābhākaras argued that sentence meanings are grasped directly, from perceptual and contextual cues, skipping the stage of grasping singly the individual word meanings, similar to the modern view of linguistic underspecification, which relates to the Dynamic Turn in Semantics, that also opposes purely compositional approaches to sentence meaning.

Defense against Buddhism
Kumārila Bhaṭṭa is known for his defense of Vedic ritualism against medieval Buddhist idealism. With the aim to prove the superiority of Vedic scripture, Kumārila Bhaṭṭa presented several novel arguments:

1. "Buddhist (or Jain) scripture could not be correct because it had several grammatical lapses." He specifically takes the Buddhist verse: 'ime samkhada dhamma sambhavanti sakarana akarana vinassanti' (These phenomena arise when the cause is present and perish when the cause is absent). Thus he presents his argument:

2. Every extant school held some scripture to be correct. To show that the Veda was the only correct scripture, Kumārila said that "the absence of an author would safeguard the Veda against all reproach" (apaurusheya). There was "no way to prove any of the contents of Buddhist scriptures directly as wrong in spirit...", unless one challenges the legitimacy and eternal nature of the scripture itself. It is well known that the Pali Canon was composed after the Buddha's parinirvana. Further, even if they were the Buddha's words, they were not eternal or unauthored like the Vedas.

3. The Sautrantika Buddhist school believed that the universe was momentary (kshanika). Kumārila said that this was absurd, given that the universe does not disappear every moment. No matter how small one would define the duration of a moment, one could divide the moment into infinitely further parts. Kumārila argues: "if the universe does not exist between moments, then in which of these moments does it exist?" Because a moment could be infinitesimally small, Bhaṭṭa argued that the Buddhist was claiming that the universe was non-existent.

4. The Determination of perception (pratyaksha pariccheda).

Some scholars believe that Kumārila's understanding of Buddhist philosophy was far greater than that of any other non-Buddhist philosopher of his time. However, see Taber 2010 for an alternate view.

According to Buton Rinchen Drub, Kumārila spoke abusively towards his nephew, Dharmakīrti, as he was taking his brahminical garments. This drove Dharmakīrti away, and resolving to vanquish all non-Buddhist heretics he took the robes of the Buddhist order instead.

Legendary life
According to legend, Kumārila went to study Buddhism at Nalanda (the largest 4th-century university in the world), with the aim of refuting Buddhist doctrine in favour of Vedic religion. He was expelled from the university when he protested against his teacher (Dharmakirti) ridiculing the Vedic rituals. Legend has it that even though he was thrown off of the university's tower, he survived with an eye injury by claiming "if the Vedas are the ultimate then I will be spared from Death". Modern Mimamsa scholars and followers of Vedanta believe that this was because he imposed a condition on the infallibility of the Vedas thus encouraging the Hindu belief that one should not even doubt the infallibility of the Vedas.

The Madhaviya Sankara Digvijayam, a 14th-century hagiographic work on the life of Sankara, claims that Sankara challenged Bhaṭṭa to a debate on his deathbed. Kumārila Bhaṭṭa could not debate Sankara  as he was punishing himself to have disrespected his Buddhist teacher by defeating him in a debate using the Vedas by self-immolation at the banks of Ganga at Prayagraj and instead directed him to argue with his student Mandana Misra in Mahiṣmati. He said:

Works
 Shlokavartika ("Exposition on the Verses", commentary on Shabara's Commentary on Jaimini's Mimamsa Sutras, Bk. 1, Ch. 1) 
 Tantravartika ("Exposition on the Sacred Sciences", commentary on Shabara's Commentary on Jaimini's Mimamsa Sutras, Bk. 1, Ch. 2–4 and Bks. 2–3) 
 Tuptika ("Full Exposition" commentary on Shabara's Commentary on Jaimini's Mimamsa Sutras, Bks. 4–9) 
 Kataoka, Kei, Kumarila on Truth, Omniscience and Killing. Part 1: A Critical Edition of Mimamasa-Slokavarttika ad 1.1.2 (Codanasutra). Part 2: An Annotated Translation of Mimamsa-Slokavarttika ad 1.1.2 (Codanasutra) (Wien, 2011) (Sitzungsberichte der philosophisch-historischen Klasse, 814; Beiträge zur Kultur- und Geistesgeschichte Asiens, 68).

References

Sources

Arnold, Daniel Anderson. Buddhists, Brahmins, and Belief: Epistemology in South Asian Philosophy of Religion. Columbia University Press, 2005. .

Bhatt, Govardhan P. The Basic Ways of Knowing: An In-depth Study of Kumārila's Contribution to Indian Epistemology. Delhi: Motilal Banarasidass, 1989. .

External links
 Text of Mimamsalokavarttika Chapter 5, by Kumarila Bhatta (in transliterated Sanskrit)
 https://web.archive.org/web/20070509144740/http://www.crvp.org/book/Series03/IIIB-4/introduction.htm
 http://www.ourkarnataka.com/books/saartha_book_review.htm

8th-century Indian philosophers
Atheist philosophers
Critics of Buddhism
Hindu philosophers and theologians
Indian Medieval linguists
Indian Sanskrit scholars
Medieval Sanskrit grammarians
Scholars from Assam